NADH dehydrogenase [ubiquinone] 1 subunit C1, mitochondrial is an enzyme that in humans is encoded by the NDUFC1 gene.

References

Further reading

Human proteins